Troitsky District is an administrative and municipal district (raion), one of the twenty-seven in Chelyabinsk Oblast, Russia. It is located in the central and eastern parts of the oblast. Its administrative center is the town of Troitsk (which is not administratively a part of the district). Population:  33,816 (2002 Census);

Administrative and municipal status
Within the framework of administrative divisions, Troitsky District is one of the twenty-seven in the oblast. The town of Troitsk serves as its administrative center, despite being incorporated separately as an administrative unit with the status equal to that of the districts.

As a municipal division, the district is incorporated as Troitsky Municipal District. The Town of Troitsk is incorporated separately from the district as Troitsky Urban Okrug.

References

Notes

Sources

Districts of Chelyabinsk Oblast
